John Coatman, CIE, (1889–1963) was director of public information for the Indian Police Service and the British government in India. He was made a Companion of the Order of the Indian Empire in 1929 and was a member of the secretariat during the first Round Table Conference (November 1930 – January 1931). His writing promoted the benefits of the British Empire.

Selected publications
Report of the administration of Lord Reading, Viceroy and Governor-General of India, 1921–1926: General summary, Government of India Press, Simla, 1927.
The Indian Riddle: A solution suggested, Humphrey Toulmin, London, 1932.
Years of Destiny India 1926–1932, 1932.
Magna Britannia, Jonathan Cape, London, 1936.
India the Road to Self Government, George Allen & Unwin, 1941.
The British Family of Nations, George G. Harrap & Co., London, 1950.
Volkerfamilie commonwealth: die verwirklichung eines politischen ideals, Deutsch Verlags-Anstalt, Stuttgart, 1950.
Police, Oxford University Press, 1959. (Home University Library of Modern Knowledge)
Eric Charles Handyside, C.I.E., O.B.E., Indian Police, Tunbridge Wells, c. 1962.

References 

Companions of the Order of the Indian Empire
1889 births
1963 deaths